Mabel Young was an iron barque built in 1877 by Alexander Stephen & Sons, Glasgow, as Yard No. 215. Dimensions: 211'0"×33'6"×20'45 and tonnage: 1046 GRT, 1015 NRT. Rigged with royals, over single topgallant and double topsails.

1877 November 21

Launched at the shipyard of Alexander Stephen & Sons, Glasgow, for Killick Martin & Company, London. Captain Joseph Smith Crane late of the same owner's ship John C. Munro.

Killick Martin & Company owned eight shares in the vessel, Edward Boustead eight shares, and his partners William Wardrop Shaw eight shares and Jasper Young 40 shares. It is surmised that the vessel was named after Jasper Young's wife or daughter.

1878 January 17 - June 2

Sailed from Glasgow to San Francisco in 136 days.

1878 July 30 - November 25

Sailed from San Francisco to Liverpool in 118 days with a cargo of wheat. The Dallam Tower which sailed on the same day as the Mabel Young arrived to Liverpool 122 days out.

1878 December 23 - April 15

Sailed from Liverpool to Calcutta in 113 days

1879 June 10

Sailed from Calcutta for Dundee with a cargo of 1220 tons of jute, 150 tons of bone dust and 50 tons of old iron.

1879 July 31

Foundered some 30 miles SE of Algoa Bay on voyage from Calcutta to Dundee with a cargo of jute.

References

External links 
 Killick Martin & Company Ltd
 Bruzelius: Killick Martin & Company Fleet

Maritime incidents in July 1879
Individual sailing vessels
Victorian-era merchant ships of the United Kingdom
Ships built in Glasgow
1877 ships